Mind Hive is the seventeenth studio album from English art punk band Wire, released on 24 January 2020 by Pinkflag. The release was preceded by a music video for "Cactused" made up of clips from the forthcoming documentary People in a Film and streaming audio for "Primed and Ready". They also announced a brief tour of North America to promote the recording.

Critical reception

 Review aggregator AnyDecentMusic? assess the critical consensus as a 7.7 out of 10. Brooklyn Vegan praised the album saying Wire "have honed a sound that pulls from all periods of the band." Alexis Petridis of The Guardian gave the album four out of five stars and said, "If Mind Hive were the debut by a hot new band, you suspect what's left of the music press would be doing their nut over it."

Accolades

Track listing
All songs written by Colin Newman, except "Oklahoma" by Graham Lewis. All music by Wire. All lyrics by Graham Lewis, except "Cactused" and "Unrepentant" by Colin Newman. (Songwriting credits as per liner notes for Mind Hive)

"Be Like Them" – 3:51
"Cactused" – 3:35
"Primed and Ready" – 2:44
"Off the Beach" – 2:23
"Unrepentant" – 5:01
"Shadows" – 2:46
"Oklahoma" – 3:08
"Hung" – 7:54
"Humming" – 3:30

Personnel
Wire
Graham Lewis – bass guitar, backing vocals on "Be Like Them" and "Cactused", synthesizer on "Oklahoma", vocals on "Oklahoma" and "Humming"; effects on "Hung"
Robert Grey – drums, cymbals on "Unrepentant"
Colin Newman – vocals, guitar; keyboards; acoustic guitar on "Be Like Them", "Off the Beach", "Unrepentant", and "Shadows"; 12-string acoustic guitar on "Off the Beach" and "Unrepentant"; stylophone on "Hung"; tenor guitar on "Be Like Them" and "Unrepentant"
Matthew Simms – guitar; synths on "Be Like Them", "Primed and Ready", "Unrepentant", "Oklahoma", and "Hung"; effects on "Hung"; organ on "Humming"

Additional musicians
Sean Douglas – organ on "Humming"
Harald Pettersson – hurdy gurdy on "Oklahoma"

Technical
Colin Newman – producer, mixing
Sean Douglas – engineer
Matthew Simms – additional engineer
Denis Blackham – mastering
Jon Wozencroft – art direction, photography

Charts

See also
List of 2020 albums

References

External links

2020 albums
Self-released albums
Wire (band) albums